Joseph Morris Gersten (born July 19, 1947) was an American politician in the state of Florida.

He served in the Florida House of Representatives from 1974 to 1981 (109th district). He also served in the Florida Senate from 1982 to 1986.

References

1947 births
Living people
Democratic Party members of the Florida House of Representatives
Politicians from Miami
Democratic Party Florida state senators
20th-century American politicians
New York University alumni
Sophia University alumni
University System of Maryland alumni
University of Miami School of Law alumni